Georg Meyer is a paralympic athlete from Germany competing mainly in category T46/F46 events.

Meyer competed in the 2000 Summer Paralympics in the 200m, javelin and high jump and was part of the German team in the T46 4 × 400 m and the bronze medal-winning 4 × 100 m team.

References

Paralympic athletes of Germany
Athletes (track and field) at the 1996 Summer Paralympics
Athletes (track and field) at the 2000 Summer Paralympics
Paralympic bronze medalists for Germany
Living people
Medalists at the 1996 Summer Paralympics
Medalists at the 2000 Summer Paralympics
Year of birth missing (living people)
Paralympic medalists in athletics (track and field)
German male sprinters
German male high jumpers
German male javelin throwers
Sprinters with limb difference
High jumpers with limb difference
Javelin throwers with limb difference
Paralympic sprinters
Paralympic high jumpers
Paralympic javelin throwers